Alan Khasanovich Sakiyev (born 2 August 1981) is a former Russian football player.

He represented Russia at the 1998 UEFA European Under-16 Championship.

In 2003, he was seriously injured in a car accident which killed 3 other people, including a professional player Tamerlan Tskhovrebov.

External links
 

1981 births
Living people
Place of birth missing (living people)
Russian footballers
Association football midfielders
FC Spartak Vladikavkaz players
Russian Premier League players
FC Sokol Saratov players
FC Spartak-UGP Anapa players